Josh Singer (born 1972) is an American screenwriter and producer. He is best known for writing The Fifth Estate (2013), Spotlight (2015), The Post (2017) and First Man (2018). He won the Academy Award for Best Original Screenplay for Spotlight and was nominated for the Golden Globe for Best Screenplay for Spotlight and The Post.

Early life and education
Singer was born in Philadelphia, Pennsylvania, and was raised Jewish. His father was born Jewish, and his mother converted to Judaism (she herself was born to a Jewish father and a Catholic mother). Singer attended Upper Dublin High School in Fort Washington, Pennsylvania, where he appeared in musicals and was a member of math club, drama club, video club, and chorus. In high school, he was elected class treasurer, wrote for the school newspaper, and played for the school's baseball team. Singer won many awards, including the Upper Dublin Medal, science competition and literary prizes, and was co-winner of the school district's highest award. In his senior year, he was named class valedictorian, a Presidential Scholar and a National Merit Scholar.

Singer graduated magna cum laude from Yale University, with distinction in mathematics and economics. At Yale, he was a member and business manager of both The Whiffenpoofs and The Yale Alley Cats. Three to four months prior to going to graduate school, he worked for Children's Television Workshop (the name, at that time, of the production company for the TV show "Sesame Street",) and then began doing internships. He did an internship for Nickelodeon in New York and an internship for Disney Channel out in L.A., working for Roy Price at Disney TV Animation for four or five weeks. As a result, he developed an interest in script writing.    He worked as a business analyst for McKinsey & Company before obtaining a J.D. from Harvard Law School and an MBA from Harvard Business School.

Career
After Singer graduated from Harvard, he was hired by showrunner John Wells to write for The West Wing.

In 2006 he was nominated for a WGA award.

In 2012, Singer wrote the screenplay for The Fifth Estate. In 2015, he co-wrote the screenplay for Spotlight, for which he received an Academy Award for Best Original Screenplay.

Personal life
In 2011, Singer married the American novelist Laura Dave. They have one son and reside in Los Angeles, California.

Filmography 
Film

Television

Awards and nominations 
Singer won the Academy Award for Best Original Screenplay for Spotlight in 2015 and was nominated for the Golden Globe Award for Best Screenplay for the film. He also received a Golden Globe nomination for The Post in 2018.

References

External links
 

Television producers from Pennsylvania
American television writers
Living people
Place of birth missing (living people)
1972 births
Yale University alumni
Harvard Law School alumni
People from Upper Dublin Township, Pennsylvania
Harvard Business School alumni
McKinsey & Company people
Writers from Philadelphia
American male screenwriters
American male television writers
Jewish American writers
Independent Spirit Award winners
Best Original Screenplay Academy Award winners
Best Original Screenplay BAFTA Award winners
Screenwriters from Pennsylvania
Best Screenplay AACTA International Award winners
21st-century American Jews